Visa requirements for Namibian citizens are administrative entry restrictions by the authorities of other states placed on citizens of Namibia. As of 7 July 2021, Namibian citizens had visa-free or visa on arrival access to 78 countries and territories, ranking the Namibian passport 72nd in terms of travel freedom according to the Henley Passport Index.

Visa requirements map

Visa requirements

Dependent, Disputed, or Restricted territories
Unrecognized or partially recognized countries

Dependent and autonomous territories

See also

Visa policy of Namibia
Namibian passport

External links 
Delta Airlines Visa Requirements (search engine)

References and Notes
References

Notes

Namibia
Foreign relations of Namibia